Sphingosine-1-phosphate lyase 1 is an enzyme that in humans is encoded by the SGPL1 gene.

References

Further reading